Ten Commandments Monument may refer to:

Africa 
 Ten Commandments Monument, Dwoi, Plateau State, Nigeria

North America
 Ten Commandments Monument (Austin, Texas)
 Ten Commandments Monument (Little Rock, Arkansas)
 Ten Commandments Monument (Oklahoma City)
 Ten Commandments Memorial, Phoenix, Arizona, located in Wesley Bolin Memorial Plaza
 Ten Commandments Monument, Pleasant Grove, Utah, implicated in Pleasant Grove City v. Summum
 Ten Commandments Monument, removed from the rotunda of the Alabama Judicial Building, per Glassroth v. Moore
 Ten Commandments Monument, removed from the grounds of Bloomfield, New Mexico city hall
 Ten Commandments Monument, removed from the grounds of Haskell County, Oklahoma courthouse, per Green v. Haskell County Board of Commissioners

Europe
 Monument of Ten Commandments, architectural complex in Ukraine

See also
 United States debate over display of the Ten Commandments on public property